The IPSC Far East Asia Handgun Championship is an IPSC level 4 championship hosted every third year in East Asia.

History 
 2013 Thailand
 2015 Malaysia
 2018 Thailand
 2021 Laos

References

IPSC shooting competitions
Sport in East Asia
Shooting sports in Asia
Year of establishment missing
Recurring sporting events